The 1993 Stockholm Open was a men's tennis tournament played on indoor hard courts. It was the 25th edition of the Stockholm Open and was part of the ATP Super 9 of the 1993 ATP Tour. It took place at the Stockholm Globe Arena in Stockholm, Sweden, from 25 October through 1 November 1993.

The singles draw was headlined by Pete Sampras. Fourth-seeded Michael Stich won the singles title.

Finals

Singles

 Michael Stich defeated  Goran Ivanišević, 4–6, 7–6, 7–6, 6–2
 It was Stich's 5th title of the year, and his 12th overall. It was his 2nd Masters title of the year, and overall.

Doubles

 Todd Woodbridge /  Mark Woodforde defeated  Gary Muller /  Danie Visser, 6–1, 3–6, 6–2

References

External links
 
 ATP tournament profile
 ITF tournament edition details